Beachmont is an elevated rapid transit station in Revere, Massachusetts. It serves the MBTA Blue Line, and is located above Winthrop Avenue in the Beachmont neighborhood. Beachmont station is fully accessible, with elevators from the lobby to the platforms.

History

BRB&L

The narrow gauge Boston, Revere Beach and Lynn Railroad (BRB&L) opened from East Boston to Lynn on July 28, 1875. Among the original stations was Orient (also called Orient Heights) at Winthrop Avenue. (At that time, Beachmont was considered part of Orient Heights.) The Boston Land Company, affiliated with the BRB&L, used the station to sell land on Beachmont. The BRB&L built the Beachmont hotel near the station in 1876. The station was renamed Beachmont by the 1880s, with a station building located southeast of the crossing. 

Ocean Pier station was open for several years at Dolphin Avenue  to the north in the 1880s, likely to compete with a competitor – the Eastern Railroad-backed Boston, Winthrop and Shore Railroad – which operated in 1884 and 1885.

By 1928 the line was electrified, with pre-pay stations - more a rapid transit line than a conventional railroad. However, due to the Great Depression, the BRB&L shut down on January 27, 1940.

Rapid transit

In 1941, the Boston Elevated Railway bought the BRB&L right of way from Day Square to Revere Beach for use as a high-speed trolley line similar to the Ashmont-Mattapan High Speed Line; these plans were delayed by the onset of World War II. However, the 1926 Report on Improved Transportation Facilities and 1945–47 Coolidge Commission Report recommended that the East Boston Tunnel line, which had been converted to rapid transit from streetcars in 1924, be extended to Lynn via the BBRB&L route rather than using it for a trolley line. 

In 1947, the newly formed Metropolitan Transit Authority (M.T.A.) decided to build to Lynn as a rapid transit line, and construction began in October 1948. Unlike its predecessor, this Beachmont station was elevated to eliminate the grade crossing of Winthrop Avenue.

Renovations

Beachmont station was completely rebuilt at a cost of $27 million; it reopened along with the other stations on June 24, 1995.

The station was closed while additional platform repair work was performed from September 8 through November 25, 2008. On June 1-2, 2019, the 1995-added radio tower was demolished.

The developer has committed $20 million for transit projects, including modifications to both stations. The MBTA plans to construct a bus transfer facility at the station to replace or supplement Wonderland for North Shore bus routes.

References

External links

 MBTA - Beachmont
 Winthrop Avenue entrance from Google Maps Street View

Blue Line (MBTA) stations
Former Boston, Revere Beach and Lynn Railroad stations
Railway stations in the United States opened in 1954
Railway stations in Suffolk County, Massachusetts
1954 establishments in Massachusetts
Revere, Massachusetts